Sheykh Vajim (also Romanized as Sheykh Vajīm; also known as Sheykhowjīm and Sheykh Vajam) is a village in Hoseynabad-e Jonubi Rural District, in the Central District of Sanandaj County, Kurdistan Province, Iran. At the 2006 census, its population was 114, in 19 families. The village is populated by Kurds.

References 

Towns and villages in Sanandaj County
Kurdish settlements in Kurdistan Province